Umar Bashiru (born 10 July 1997) is a Ghanaian professional footballer who currently plays as a midfielder for Ethiopian Premier League side [[Ethiopian 
Medhin  FC]],

Career 
Bashiru started his professional career with for West African Football Academy (WAFA) in 2015. He went on to play for them and serve as club captain till he moved to Kumasi-based club Asante Kotoko SC. He played for the club for 2 seasons till he moved to Karela United as a free agent ahead of the 2020–21 season after terminating his contract with Asante Kotoko before the commencement of the 2019–20 season.

References

External links 

 

1997 births
Living people
Ghanaian footballers
Ghana Premier League players
Association football midfielders
West African Football Academy players
Asante Kotoko S.C. players
Karela United FC players